Schnake is a surname. Notable people with the surname include: 

Björn Schnake (born 1971), German Paralympic table tennis player
Oscar Schnake (1899–1976), Chilean politician and physician